Paul Daccobert is a Canadian former soccer player who had stints in the USISL Pro League, and the Canadian Professional Soccer League.

Playing career 
Daccobert began his career in 1995 with the New Hampshire Ramblers in the USISL Pro League. In 1998, he signed with the Vermont Voltage, where he recorded two goals. In 2002, he was signed by the Montreal Dynamites of the Canadian Professional Soccer League. During his time with Montreal he helped the team to qualify for the postseason by finishing second in the Eastern Conference. In 2004, Daccobert signed with the Brampton Hitmen, and made his debut on June 25, 2004 in a match against Durham Storm in a 2-1 victory. He scored his first goal for the organization at the August 2, 2004 match against London City.

He finished as the club's top goalscorer with eight goals, and assisted in clinching a playoff berth by finishing fourth in the Western Conference. The following season he signed with expansion franchise the Oakville Blue Devils . During the 2005 season he helped Oakville finish second in the Western Conference, and win his first CPSL Championship by defeating Vaughan Shooters by a score of 2-1.

Honors

Oakville Blue Devils
CPSL Championship (1): 2005

References 

Living people
Canadian Soccer League (1998–present) players
Canadian soccer players
Canadian expatriate soccer players
Brampton Stallions (Hitmen) players
Laval Dynamites players
Brampton United players
Vermont Voltage players
Soccer players from Montreal
USL Second Division players
Association football midfielders
Year of birth missing (living people)